Chief Joseph Folahan Odunjo  (1904–1980) was a Nigerian writer, educator and politician best known for his works in Yoruba children's literature.

Early life and education
Odunjo was born in Ibara, Abeokuta in 1904. He was educated at St Augustine's Primary School, Abeokuta, the Catholic Higher Elementary Training School and the London Institute of Education.

Teaching and Writing career
Odunjo commenced his teaching career as the schoolmaster of the Catholic Training College, Ibadan from 1924 till 1927 and was later the headmaster of his alma mater, St Augustine's, Abeokuta. As a teacher, he formed the Federal Association of Catholic Teachers to negotiate with the Catholic missions on behalf of mission teachers.
Odunjo was a teacher and headmaster of various Catholic Schools from the 1940s to the 1950s. His printed work in 1958 was one of the early written works of the language. He wrote several novels, plays, poems and texts in the Yoruba language. His published works later became a source of inspiration for future writers. He was an active member of the Yoruba Orthography Committees of 1966 and 1969. He was also affiliated with the Nigeria Union of Teachers for a number of years.

Politics
In 1951, he won a seat to the Western House of assembly and later became the region's first minister of Land and Labour.
He was a president of the Egbado Union. He was also awarded the chieftaincy title of the Asiwaju of Egbaland.

Chief Odunjo died in 1980.

Selected works

Poetry
Ise ni Ogun Ise ("Work is the antidote for poverty")
Toju Iwa re Oremi ("Watch your behaviour, my friend")
Akójopò ewì alâdùn (1961)

Novels
Omo oku orun (1964; "The deceased woman's daughter")
Kuye  (1978)

Textbook
Aláwìíyé Yoruba Readers (Fun awọn ọmọde ati awọn agbà ti o nkọ́ iwe Yoruba ni kikà: Yoruba language comprehensive learning text series)  (1975)

References

Yoruba-language writers
Yoruba-language poets
1904 births
1980 deaths
Writers from Abeokuta
Yoruba writers
20th-century Nigerian writers
Nigerian children's writers
20th-century Nigerian politicians
Yoruba educators
Nigerian schoolteachers
Politicians from Abeokuta
Yoruba children's writers
Alumni of the UCL Institute of Education
Yoruba dramatists and playwrights
20th-century Nigerian dramatists and playwrights
20th-century Nigerian educators
Yoruba politicians
Federal ministers of Nigeria
People from colonial Nigeria
Heads of schools in Nigeria